Blackout is an original novel based on the U.S. television series Buffy the Vampire Slayer.

Plot summary

It is 1977, the summer of a brutal blackout, the time of the Son of Sam murders, and a period of brutal fiscal disaster for New York City. The slayer Nikki Wood fights against the forces of darkness and also tries to protect her son, Robin. Meanwhile, Spike and Drusilla arrive in the city hoping to hunt down a slayer, not without the local vampire community soon discovering of their arrival.

Continuity 
 It is mentioned that Nikki had been the slayer for 4 years. And a specific date of February 10, 1973 is given for when her watcher informs her of her calling.

See also

Spike-related comics and novels
Old Times
Spike vs Dracula
Old Wounds
Lost and Found
Spike & Dru
Asylum
Pretty Maids All in a Row
Spark and Burn

External links
Keith R.A. DeCandido posts an announcement about his upcoming book
Whedonesquers discuss upcoming book 
DeCandido.net - Keith R.A. DeCandido reveals more details about influences on the book, and its plot
Whedonesquers discuss details revealed at DeCandido.net
Interview with author
An excerpt from the novel
Whedonesquers discuss the excerpt

Reviews
Teen-books.com - Reviews of this book

2006 novels
Books based on Buffy the Vampire Slayer
Fiction set in 1977